Lake Washburn is a lake that formerly existed in the Taylor Valley, McMurdo Dry Valleys, Antarctica. It formed when climatic changes and an expansion of ice caused the flooding of the valley, between 23,000 and 8,340 radiocarbon years ago. Its extent and elevation are unclear but Lake Bonney and Lake Fryxell are considered to be its present-day remnant.

Location of the former lake 

Lake Washburn was located in Taylor Valley, McMurdo Dry Valleys. It either covered the southwestern part of the valley where Lake Bonney now lies, or the northeastern part above present-day Lake Fryxell; the present-day lakes in Taylor Valley may be remnants of Lake Washburn. The former lake was named in 1960 after Albert Lincoln Washburn. 

It was probably dammed by ice that filled the northwestern part of Taylor Valley, when the Ross Ice Shelf expanded during the Last Glacial Maximum. Depending on how much the ice shelf expanded, two different sizes of the lakes are possible, the smaller of which would have been limited to the Lake Bonney basin at the western end of the valley. Delta deposits that were reinterpreted as river deposits and salt accumulations below the maximum lake levels point to a small size of Lake Washburn as do the properties of soils around the hypothesized shorelines, while soil carbonates and the presence of unfrozen groundwater in the area that would have been covered by a large Lake Washburn implies a large size. The lake extended into Hjorth Valley.

The Canada Glacier, Commonwealth Glacier and Howard Glacier probably reached its shores, while other glaciers such as Crescent Glacier contributed runoff to Lake Washburn. The Ross Ice Sheet formed a subaqueous moraine in Lake Washburn. Icebergs calving from the Ross Ice Sheet pushed the lake ice away and transported debris into the lake, where it generated ridges and mounds on the now exposed lakefloor. Wind transported aeolian sediments into the lake.

Chronology and disappearance

The ice dam existed between 23,000-8,340 radiocarbon years ago and the extent of the lake fluctuated in response to climatic and glacier changes, but they are poorly documented. Evaporation appears to be responsible for the decrease in water levels at the beginning of the Holocene, after which it split into Lake Fryxell and Lake Hoare. It is possible that leftover ice from the Ross Ice Sheet delayed the decline of the lake for millennia, into the middle Holocene.

It left carbonates and lake sediments in the Taylor Valley; organic matter in these sediments constitutes an important component of and organic matter input the present-day soils in the valley while the presence of non-marine diatoms in the sediments demonstrates that they were not deposited by the sea. The Alpine I Drift from later glacial advances overlies the Lake Washburn deposits. Local springtail populations bear imprints of the former existence of the lake. Later water level fluctuations in the valleys could have caused the lakes to dry out and overspill.

Geographical and climatic context 

The McMurdo Dry Valleys are presently unglaciated, as the Transantarctic Mountains block glaciers and moisture from reaching the valleys. During December and January, meltwater flows from the glaciers to the lakes. Occasionally, during summer strong winds blow from the Antarctic Ice Sheet through the valleys to the sea; these winds warm as they descend into the valleys and can melt the ice, causing water levels to rise.

There is evidence that during the last glacial maximum, these lakes expanded in size despite drier and colder conditions; several different mechanisms ranging from more effective melting of glaciers during drought, increased temperatures, supply of subglacial water from the Ross Ice Shelf to more intense winds that warmed the valleys, inducing ice melt, have been proposed. The water in these lakes would have been prevented from discharging to the sea by the expanded Ross Ice Shelf, which at that time penetrated the valleys and blocked the outlet at Explorers Cove. Some of the lakes persisted into the Holocene; presumably their outlets were still blocked by glacier tills even after the ice had retreated at the beginning of the Holocene.

Precise dating of these paleolakes is rendered difficult, however, by the rarity of dateable deposits and the unreliability of radiocarbon dates due to reservoir effects. The existence of Lake Washburn appears to be secure; a proposal that a lake also existed in Victoria Valley was contested as being due to landslides rather than from a former lake. Present-day Lake Vanda may resemble the former Lake Washburn although it has a distinct diatom fauna.

References

Sources 

 
 
 
 
 
 
 
 
 
 
 
 
 
 
 
 
 

Lakes of Antarctica
McMurdo Dry Valleys